The Golden Arena for Best Director (Croatian: Zlatna arena za režiju) is an award given for best director at the Pula Film Festival, which was until 1992 the Yugoslav equivalent of the Academy Awards. Since 1992 and the breakup of Yugoslavia the competition narrowed to Croatian films only. The first festival was held in 1954, but the award was introduced in 1955.

List of winners

Yugoslav competition (1955–90)

Croatian competition (1992–present)

Multiple winners
The following directors have received multiple awards. The list is sorted by the number of total awards. Years in bold indicate wins in Yugoslav competition (1955–1990). Shared wins are indicated with an asterisk (*).

4 :  Zrinko Ogresta (1995, 1999, 2016, 2021)
3 :  Aleksandar Petrović (1965, 1967*, 1972)
3 :  Krsto Papić (1970, 1992, 1998)
3 :  Dalibor Matanić (2002, 2011, 2015)
2 :  Branko Bauer (1956*, 1963)
2 :  Matjaž Klopčič (1973, 1975)

2 :  Živojin Pavlović (1968, 1977)
2 :  Goran Paskaljević (1976, 1980)
2 :  Srđan Karanović (1978, 1983)
2 :  Vinko Brešan (1996, 2003)
2 :  Rajko Grlić (1984, 2010)
2 :  Kristijan Milić (2007, 2014)

References

External links
Web archive 1954–2010 at the Pula Film Festival official website 

Pula Film Festival
Awards for best director
Croatia-related lists
Awards established in 1955
1955 establishments in Yugoslavia